West Reading is a locality or informal subdivision of the town of Reading in the English county of Berkshire, with its own railway station which opened in 1906, by which time its main roads were an established housing area. West Reading is one of multiple suburbs of Reading such as Tilehurst and Whitley.

Extent

The locality has no formal boundaries, but the name is generally used to refer to the area to the west of Reading's commercial centre, merging into or to the north of the suburbs of Coley and Southcote, to the east of the suburb of Tilehurst and to the south of the Reading to Bristol railway line. As such it includes the relatively densely populated area along and surrounding the Oxford Road as far as the foot of Norcot Hill, which is a typical example of the British town's rows of terraced houses, as well as the more affluent area between this road and the Bath Road and alongside Tilehurst Road as far as Prospect Park and its slopes.

West Reading is in the borough of Reading, comprising Battle ward together with parts of Abbey, Minster, Norcot and Southcote wards.

Whereas most of this area is in the Reading West parliamentary constituency, the Abbey ward portion (between the Inner Distribution Road and Prospect Street / George Street) is in the Reading East parliamentary constituency.

History

The area has a 21st-century supermarket and residential estate on the site of Battle Hospital, once Reading's largest general hospital in site area, adjoining Oxford Road.

The Elm Park stadium in West Reading was home to Reading Football Club from 1896 to 1998 and was redeveloped as a housing estate between 1998 and 2000.

The Bath Road Reservoir, a minor water storage reservoir and ornate brick-built pumping station is an elevated landmark along the Bath Road, built in the late Victorian era.  The early 21st-century years saw residents' opposition defeat an attempt by Thames Water to demolish the pumping station, level the reservoir and redevelop the site for housing.

Transport

West Reading is served by Reading West railway station on the local lines between Reading/Basingstoke and Reading/Newbury. Reading Buses operates frequent services along the Oxford Road, Bath Road and Tilehurst Road corridors.

Amenities and events

The district contains the Church of England parish churches of All Saints, Holy Trinity, St. Mark and Tylehurst St George, together with English Martyrs Church in the Catholic church.

The Reading Half Marathon runs through the streets of West Reading every year and into the town centre.

References

Suburbs of Reading, Berkshire